The table below lists the judgments of the Constitutional Court of South Africa delivered in 2017.

The members of the court at the start of 2017 were Chief Justice Mogoeng Mogoeng and judges Edwin Cameron, Johan Froneman, Chris Jafta, Sisi Khampepe, Mbuyiseli Madlanga, Nonkosi Mhlantla, Bess Nkabinde and Raymond Zondo. There were two vacancies following the retirement in 2016 of Deputy Chief Justice Dikgang Moseneke and Johann van der Westhuizen. In June, Raymond Zondo was elevated to the position of Deputy Chief Justice, and in July Leona Theron was appointed to the court. Bess Nkabinde retired at the end of the year. Fayeeza Kathree-Setiloane, Jody Kollapen, Boissie Mbha, Phineas Mojapelo, Cagney Musi, Cynthia Pretorius and Dumisani Zondi sat as acting judges on judgments delivered in this year.

References
 

2017
Constitutional Court